Azizunnessa Khatun (1864–1940) was a Bengali poet, writer, and philanthropist.

Early life and education
Azizunnessa Khatun was born in 1864 to a Bengali Muslim family in Jamalpur, 24 Parganas, Bengal Presidency. Her father, Mir Chand Ali, was a Police Inspector, and their ancestral home was in Goadi, Nadia district. Khatun's early education began at home where she was taught the Arabic, Bengali, English, and Persian languages. 

During her teenage years, Khatun married Moqaddesul Haque of Banshdaha. Haque encouraged his wife to continue her education, and so she enrolled at the St. Xavier's College in Calcutta where she studied Bengali and English under Professor Mairajuddin.

Personal life
After the death of her first husband, Moqaddesul Haque, Khatun married Maulvi Qazi Hamidullah Khan, the erstwhile Zamindar of Tetulia. After the latter's death, Khatun married Qazi Lutfur Rahman of Banshdaha, though he too died soon after.

Career
Khatun was a philanthropist. She funded the digging of ponds so that villagers could have access to clean water. She also founded a girls elementary school. In 1884, Khatun translated a work by the Anglo-Irish poet Thomas Parnell into Bengali, which she titled Udasīn Kabbo. Her works were published in a number of magazines.

Death
Khatun died in Basirhat in 1940. One of her sons through Hamidullah Khan was Maulvi Qazi Mohammad Minnatullah Khan, a distinguished member of the Qazis of Tetulia.

References

1864 births
1940 deaths
19th-century Bengali poets
20th-century Bengali poets
19th-century translators
Bengali female poets
Translators from English
19th-century women writers
People from Nadia district
St. Xavier's College, Kolkata alumni